The 2015–16 Fairleigh Dickinson Knights women's basketball team represents Fairleigh Dickinson University during the 2015–16 NCAA Division I women's basketball season. The Knights are coached by Peter Cinella, who is in his eighth season, at the helm. The Knights compete in the Northeast Conference. They play their home games at the Rothman Center, which seats 5,000, in Hackensack, New Jersey.

Roster

Schedule

|-
!colspan=9 style="background:#800020; color:#FFFFFF;"| Non-Conference Regular Season

|-

|-
!colspan=9 style="background:#800020; color:#FFFFFF;"| Northeast Conference Regular Season

|-

|-

|-
!colspan=9 style="background:#800020; color:#FFFFFF;"| Northeast Conference tournament
|-

References

Fairleigh Dickinson
Fairleigh Dickinson Knights women's basketball
Fairleigh Dickinson
Fairleigh Dickinson